Child and Parent Resource Institute is a provincially operated, regional resource centre located at 600 Sanatorium Road, N6H 3W7 London, Ontario, Canada, providing services for children (0–18 years) with special needs, including developmental and mental health disorders. CPRI services, and is run by, the province of Ontario.

A class action lawsuit was brought against the Province of Ontario on behalf of  individuals formerly admitted as inpatients to CPRI in London, Ontario. The action was certified as a class proceeding on December 22, 2016. The lawsuit included children admitted to CPRI as inpatients between September 1, 1963, and July 1, 2011, and was alive as of 2014, but excluded any time for which an individual was an inpatient and resided in the Glenhurst or Pratten 1 units.

The lawsuit alleged that between 1963 and 2011, the inpatients at CPRI suffered various harms, including physical and sexual abuse, which are covered under the settlement. Of the settlement, CPRI states on its website, "The lawsuit alleged that between 1963 and 2011, the inpatients at CPRI suffered various harms, including injuries resulting from the wrongful acts of their peers, and that the Province owed a duty to supervise and failed to adequately ensure the safety of those individuals admitted. The Province denies these claims and a Court has not decided whether the Class or the Province is right. Instead, both sides have agreed to a settlement."

The Ontario government denied the allegations but agreed to settle out of court with the plaintiff at a last-minute mediation in March, just before a 12-week trial was set to begin. A Settlement Agreement was approved by the Ontario Superior Court of Justice on July 22, 2021. A copy of the Settlement Agreement can be viewed here.

CPRI Description: 
The Child and Parent Resource Institute (CPRI), formerly the Children's Psychiatric Research Institute (rebranded in 1992), is directly operated by the Ministry of Children, Community and Social Services of Ontario. As of 2011, it was delisted by the province for performing inpatient services and now offers outpatient services, following victim reports of abuse.

CPRI states that it provides highly specialized (tertiary) diagnostic assessment, consultation, education, research, and short-term treatment services. It aims to provide trauma-informed and highly specialized services for children and youth of Ontario (age 0–18 years) who experience complex and long-standing combinations of mental health difficulties and/or developmental challenges where:
 These difficulties significantly impact functioning in multiple areas such as home, school, and community and;
 Appropriate community interventions have not produced the desired response.

Services Provided by CPRI

References 
 Information London: Child and Parent Resource Institute (CPRI)
 
 Children's Mental Health Ontario: Child and Parent Resource Institute

External links 
 Official site of Child and Parent Resource Institute (CPRI)

Buildings and structures in London, Ontario
Education in London, Ontario
Medical and health organizations based in Ontario
Special education in Canada
Special schools in Canada